The sleepwalking scene is a critically celebrated scene from William Shakespeare's tragedy Macbeth (1606).  The first scene in the tragedy's 5th act, the sleepwalking scene is written principally in prose, and follows the guilt-wracked, sleepwalking Lady Macbeth as she recollects horrific images and impressions from her past.  The scene is Lady Macbeth's last on-stage appearance, though her death is reported later in the act.  Well known phrases from the scene include "Out, damned spot!" and "All the perfumes of Arabia will not sweeten this little hand." The British tragedienne Sarah Siddons (1755–1831) was distinguished for her performance and interpretation of the scene.

Summary
The sleepwalking scene opens with a conference between two characters making their first appearances, the Doctor of Physic and the Waiting-Gentlewoman.  The Gentlewoman indicates Lady Macbeth has walked in her sleep. She will not report to the Doctor anything Lady Macbeth has spoken in her somnambulistic state, having no witness to confirm her testimony.

Carrying a taper (candlestick), Lady Macbeth enters sleepwalking. The Doctor and the Gentlewoman stand aside to observe. The Doctor asks how Lady Macbeth came to have the light. The Gentlewoman replies she has ordered a light be beside her at all times (she is now afraid of the dark, having committed her crimes under its cover). Lady Macbeth rubs her hands in a washing motion.  With anguish, she recalls the deaths of King Duncan, Lady Macduff, and Banquo, then leaves. The Gentlewoman and the bewildered Doctor exeunt, realizing these are the symptoms of a guilt-ridden mind. The Doctor feels Lady Macbeth is beyond his help, saying she has more need of "the divine than the physician". He orders the Gentlewoman to remove from Lady Macbeth the "means of all annoyance", anticipating she might commit suicide. Despite his warning, the audience is informed in Act 5, Scene 5, that Lady Macbeth has managed to commit suicide off-stage.

Performances

John Philip Kemble's 1794 Drury Lane production starred his leading lady and sister Sarah Siddons who offered a fiercely psychological portrait of Lady Macbeth.  Siddons was noted for moving audiences in the sleepwalking scene with her depiction of a soul in profound torment. Siddons' interpretations contributed to the then new movement in literary criticism that focused on character as the essence of Shakespearean drama.

William Hazlitt commented on Siddons' interpretation and performance of the sleepwalking scene: In coming on in the sleeping-scene, her eyes were open, but their sense was shut. She was like a person bewildered and unconscious of what she did. Her lips moved involuntarily—all her gestures were involuntary and mechanical. She glided on and off the stage like an apparition. To have seen her in that character was an event in every one's life, not to be forgotten.

In modern times, Francesca Annis garnered attention for her performance in Roman Polanski's film version of Macbeth (1971), in which she performs the sleepwalking soliloquy in the nude. The critic Kenneth Tynan was present when the scene was shot:Francesca does it very sportingly and with no fuss ... though of course the set is closed, great curtains are drawn around the acting area ... and the wardrobe mistress rushes to cover Francesca with a dressing gown the instant Roman says, 'Cut'.

References

Macbeth
Mental health in fiction
Sleepwalking